The 2017–18 California Golden Bears men's basketball team represented the University of California, Berkeley in the 2017–18 NCAA Division I men's basketball season. This was Wyking Jones first year as head coach at California. The Golden Bears played their home games at Haas Pavilion as members of the Pac-12 Conference. They finished the season 8–24, 2–16 in Pac-12 play to finish in last place. They lost in the first round of the Pac-12 tournament to Stanford.

Previous season

The Golden Bears finished the season 21–13, 10–8 in the conference. During the season, they were invited and participated in the Pearl Harbor Basketball Invitational in Honolulu, Hawaii. California defeated Princeton but lost to Seton Hall to earn 2nd place. In the postseason, the Golden Bears defeated Oregon State and Utah in Pac-12 tournament in Paradise, Nevada to advance to the semifinals where they lost to Oregon. California was invited and participated in the 2017 National Invitation Tournament where they lost in the first round to Cal State Bakersfield; the Golden Bears hosted the match against the Roadrunners.

Off-season

Departures

Incoming transfers

2017 recruiting class

School Offers by Recruit

 Juhwan Harris-Dyson: California & Utah
 Trevin Knell: Air Force, California, Montana, Rice, Robert Morris, San Diego, Santa Clara, Southern Utah, Utah State, Utah Valley, Washington State, Weber State, & Wyoming
 Justice Sueing: California, Hawaii, Saint Mary's, San Francisco, & Utah
 Grant Anticevich: California

Future recruits

2018–19 team recruits

Roster

Schedule and results

|-
!colspan=9 style=| Exhibition

|-
!colspan=9 style=| Non-conference regular season

|-
!colspan=9 style=|  Pac-12 regular season

|-
!colspan=9 style=| Pac-12 tournament

References

California Golden Bears men's basketball seasons
California
California Golden
California Golden